Harphoul Mohini is a Hindi language   action romance  neo noir family entertainer adventure horror supernatural  thriller show based on a Haryanvi Jaat Boy and  Malayali Girl produced by Cockcrow Entertainment and Shaika Films. It aired from 13 June 2022 to 8 December 2022 on Colors TV, starring Shagun Sharma and Zebby Singh.

Plot
This is the story of Harphoul and Mohini, both are completely different from each other.

Mohini lives in Kerala with her parents and three younger sisters Malli, Velli and Savitri. Mohini's father Vijayan has lost his job and there is no boy in Kerala who can marry his daughters without dowry. Meanwhile, if Vijayan does not pay the money, then he will have to leave his house as well. Mohini promises her father that she will find a boy who does not want dowry and that she will be able to save house with her dowry gold.

Meanwhile, Harphoul, who lives in Haryana with his mother, disabled brother and sister-in-law, has to save his ancestral land from his uncle. It is decided in the Panchayat that if Harphoul is not married in a month, then the land will belong to the Panchayat.

Mai's niece, Saroj, who lives in Kerala, arranges the marriage of Harphoul and Mohini. Harphoul's uncle Balwant Chowdhury tries hard to stop Harphoul's marriage but finally Harphoul and his family reach to Kerala for the wedding. Harphoul and Mohini do not like each other but agree to the marriage for the sake of their families.

Cast

Main 
 Zebby Singh as Harphoul Chaudhary – Harveer and Phoolmati's younger son, Santok's younger brother, Manyu, Aadesh and Sukkha's best friend, Mohini's Husband (2022)
 Shagun Sharma as Mohini Chaudhary (nee Unni) – Vijayan and Shyamala's Eldest daughter, Malli, Velli and Savitri's  Eldest sister, Harphoul's Wife (2022)

Recurring 
Supriya Shukla as Phoolmati 'Maai' Chaudhary – Harveer's widow, Harphoul and Santok’s mother, Shalini and Mohini's mother-in-law (2022)
Tej Sapru  as Balwant Singh Chaudhary – Harveer's younger brother, Sharda’s husband, Harphoul and Santok’s uncle (2022)
 Jaanvi Sangwan as Sharda Chaudhary – Balwant’s wife, Harphoul and Santok’s aunt (2022)
 Priya Gautam as Devyani – Balwant's daughter in law, Rajendra's wife (2022)
 Amal Sehrawat as Santok Singh Chaudhary – Harveer and Phoolmati's elder son, Harphoul’s elder brother, Shalini's husband (2022)
Sonali Nikam as Shalini Chaudhary – Santok's wife, Harphoul’s sister-in-law (2022)
Karan Maan as Surendra Singh Chaudhary -Son of Balwant Singh Chaudhary(2022)
Kunal Jaiswal as Rajendra Singh Chaudhary - Son of Balwant Singh Chaudhary (2022)

 Preeti Gandwani as Dr. Saroj – Phoolmati's niece, Harphoul and Santok's sister, Rajan and Rahul's mother (2022)
Pankaj Vishnu as Vijayan Unni – Shyamla’s husband, Mohini, Malli, Velli and Savitri’s father (2022)
Resham Rampur as Shyamla Unni – Vijayan’s wife, Mohini, Malli, Velli and Savitri’s mother (2022)
Iqra Shaikh as Malli Unni – Vijayan and Shyamla’s second daughter, Mohini's Younger Sister, Velli and Savitri’s  Elder sister (2022)
Ashi Sharma as Velli Unni – Vijayan and Shyamla’s third daughter, Mohini and Malli Younger Sister , Savitri’s Elder sister (2022)
Aadhya Barot as Savitri 'Savi' Unni – Vijayan and Shyamla’s fourth daughter, Mohini, Malli and Velli’s  Youngest sister (2022)
Akshay Suri as Sukhvinder ‘Sukha’ – Harphoul’s best friend (2022)
Vinn Modgill as Abhimanyu ‘Manyu’ – Harphoul’s best friend (2022)
Ayan Kapoor as Aadesh – Harphoul's best friend (2022)
 Manohar Teli as Banwari Singh Chaudhary – Harveer and Balwant's cousin (2022)
Trilokchander Singh as Sarpanch(2022)
 Manish Khanna as Bhaiji – Balwant's boss (2022)
 Pradeep Duhan as Inspector (2022)
 Nupur Yadav as Ragini (2022)
 Anny Singh as Shushila (Mohini's friend) (2022)
 Abha Parmar as Ganga (2022)
 Diya Singh as Minoo(2022)
Sumit Setia as Sunder (2022)
Vishaal Kapoor as Sandeep husband of Ragini (2022)
Deepak Soni as inspector Sameer Chauhan (2022)

Special Appearance
 Shivendraa Saainiyol as Harveer Singh Chaudhury – Phoolmati's husband, Santok and Harphoul's father, Balwant's brother (2022)

References

External links 
 Harphoul Mohini at Colors TV
 
 Harphoul Mohini on Voot

2022 Indian television series debuts
Indian drama television series
Colors TV original programming
Hindi-language television shows